Something Stupid was a short-lived Australian sketch comedy series which aired in 1998 on the Seven Network. The program was produced, written and performed by much the same team that was behind the Fast Forward series. The series had the working title The Lazy Susan Show.

Synopsis
The characters of Kath, Kim, Sharon and Kel (then known as Ned) from the popular sitcom Kath & Kim appeared in a regular sketch on the program, as well as Kath's mother who would later be dropped from the Kath & Kim lineup. They had all originally appeared on Riley and Turner's previous project, Big Girl's Blouse, along with an early incarnation of Brett.

Other sketches included:

 Crack O'Dawn (a parody of breakfast news shows)
 Annie Get Your AK-47 (a parody of Annie Get Your Gun)
 Supermodel Cafe
 The Golden Boot Awards 
 The Poonce Institute (a medical drama)
 a parody of Two Fat Ladies 
 Rei-Jing (a Chinese variety show)
A parody of the song Frozen by Madonna (played by Riley)
 a Ruby Wax impersonation by Riley
 The Global World News
 Professor Janine O'Dowd and her Wonderful World of Ethnic Dance (Played by Szubanski)
 Runaway, Hosted by Flicka Dickie (played by Riley)
 Father Tom Stopit (played by Robbins)
 IntoView
 a Parody of ER
 Happy Homewares (an early incarnation of the Kath & Kim characters Prue and Trude.)
 The Potato Players of Burwood
 Positive Parenting 
Other more generic comedy sketches were also included

Cast
Marg Downey
Gina Riley
Magda Szubanski
Jane Turner
Glenn Robbins
Mark Neal
Kevin Shesux

External links

Australian comedy television series
Seven Network original programming
1998 Australian television series debuts
1998 Australian television series endings
Australian television sketch shows